The  is the 38th edition of the Japan Academy Film Prize, an award presented by the Nippon Academy-Sho Association to award excellence in filmmaking. It awarded the best films of 2014 and it took place on February 27, 2015 at the Grand Prince Hotel New Takanawa in Tokyo, Japan.

Nominees

Awards

References

External links 
  - 

Japan Academy Film Prize
2015 in Japanese cinema
Japan Academy Film Prize
February 2015 events in Japan